The Epistle of Ignatius to the Smyrnaeans (often simply called Smyrnaeans) is an epistle from circa 110 A.D. attributed to Ignatius of Antioch, a second-century bishop of Antioch, addressed to the Early Christians in Smyrna.

Composition

Smyrnaeans is one of seven epistles attributed to Ignatius that are generally accepted as authentic. In 5th century, this collection was enlarged by spurious letters.

It is clear that Smyrnaeans was written soon before the martyrdom of Ignatius, but it is uncertain when precisely this martyrdom occurred. Tradition places the martyrdom of Ignatius in the reign of Trajan, who was emperor of Rome from 98 to 117 AD. While many scholars accept the traditional dating of Ignatius' martyrdom under Trajan, others have argued for a somewhat later date. Richard Pervo dated Ignatius' death to 135-140 AD, and British classicist Timothy Barnes has argued for a date some time in the 140s AD.

Content

The epistle mentions the resurrection of Jesus: "Now, he suffered all these things for our sake, that we might be saved. And he truly suffered, even as he truly raised himself up; not as certain unbelievers say, that he suffered in semblance, they themselves only existing in semblance" (2:1a). The term translated "semblance" is the Greek work "dokein" (δοκεῖν, "to seem") from which the heresy of docetism got its name. The primary purpose of the letter to the Smyrnaeans is to counter those who make the claims of docetism.

To counter the teaching of the docetists, who claimed that Jesus did not come in the flesh, Ignatius wrote the first 7 sections demonstrating the real incarnation of Jesus, thus saying about the Eucharist: "They [the docetists] abstain from the Eucharist and from prayer, because they confess not the Eucharist to be the flesh of our Saviour Jesus Christ, which suffered for our sins, and which the Father, of His goodness, raised up again. They who deny the gift of God are perishing in their disputes" (7:1).  

The letter is also the earliest recorded evidence of the use of the term "Catholic Church.” Saint Ignatius, who wrote some 900 years before the Great Schism, uses the term "Catholic" to mean the "Universal Church".

See also

 Christianity in the 1st century
 Christianity in the 2nd century
 Early centers of Christianity
 Early Christianity
 History of early Christianity
 List of Patriarchs of Antioch

References

External links
Greek text of the Letter to the Smyrnaeans

Online text

2nd-century Christian texts
Apocryphal epistles
Ancient Smyrna